Silvercup Studios is one of the largest film and television production facilities in New York City. The studio is located in Long Island City, Queens, with another facility in the Port Morris neighborhood of the Bronx. The studio complex has been operating since 1983 in the former Silvercup Bakery building. It was founded by brothers Alan and Stuart Suna.

History 
During its early years the facility was used mostly for the filming of music videos and commercials, although occasionally scenes for motion pictures were shot there, including Highlander and Garbo Talks. Norman Leigh, well known among New York City filmmakers for his electrical/gaffing work on the 1969 film Midnight Cowboy, oversaw the studio during its first few years.

Over the years, use of the studio's space has shifted toward the production of television series.

Productions
Silvercup was the primary shooting facility for ABC's Hope & Faith, and HBO's Sex and the City and The Sopranos. Other film and television productions that have made use of the studio include:

30 Rock
Analyze That
Bear in the Big Blue House
Between the Lions
Big Daddy
Big Lake
Birth
Black Rain
Dark Water
The Deuce 
The Devil Wears Prada
Elementary
Fosse/Verdon
Fringe
Gangs of New York
Garbo Talks
Gossip Girl
Hide and Seek
Highlander
The Impostors
Jonny Zero
Julie & Julia
Just My Luck
Krush Groove
The Last Dragon
Little Children
Little Nicky
Mad Men
Manifest 
Meet the Parents
Mickey Blue Eyes
The Michael J. Fox Show
Mr. Robot
The Mysteries of Laura
No Reservations
Person of Interest
Private Parts
Quantico
Righteous Kill
The Savages
Sex and the City
Shining Time Station
Stuart Little 2
The Snoop Sisters
Two Weeks Notice
The Sopranos
Ugly Betty
Uptown Girls
What Happens in Vegas
White Collar

References

External links 
Silvercup Studios' web site

Film production companies of the United States
American film studios
Television studios in the United States
Long Island City
Buildings and structures in Queens, New York
Entertainment companies based in New York City
Entertainment companies established in 1983
1983 establishments in New York City
Port Morris, Bronx